The 2012–13 Louisiana Tech Bulldogs basketball team represented Louisiana Tech University during the 2012–13 NCAA Division I men's basketball season. The Bulldogs, led by second year head coach Michael White, played their home games at the Thomas Assembly Center and were members of the Western Athletic Conference. This was their last season as a member of the WAC as they joined Conference USA in July 2013.

Roster

Schedule

|-
!colspan=9 style="background:#002F8B; color:#FF0000;"| Exhibition
 
 
|-
!colspan=9 style="background:#002F8B; color:#FF0000;"| Regular season

|-
!colspan=9 style="background:#002F8B; color:#FF0000;"| WAC tournament

|-
!colspan=9 style="background:#002F8B; color:#FF0000;"| NIT

Rankings

References

External links
2012–13 Louisiana Tech Bulldogs basketball media guide

Louisiana Tech Bulldogs basketball seasons
Louisiana Tech
Louisiana Tech
Louis
Louis